The British Institute of Professional Photography (BIPP) is a not-for-profit organisation for professional photographers in the United Kingdom. Members must be qualified professionals, and agree to be bound by the BIPP's code of conduct.

The institute was formed as The Professional Photographers' Association on 28 March 1901, at a meeting at a hotel in Fleet Street, and has since changed its name three times, including Institute of Incorporated Photographers. From 100 members at its outset, the institute now has 800 members. Members can become qualified at three different levels as assessed by the BIPP, with the highest being Fellowship (FBIPP).

The current CEO of the British Institute of Professional Photography is Martin Baynes.

The current President of the British Institute of Professional Photography is Jon Cohen.

Organisational structure 
The Membership Services Advisory Board (MSAB) is made up of members put forward by their region. The MSAB are also responsible for choosing the board of directors.

References

External links

British photography organisations
1901 establishments in the United Kingdom
Organizations established in 1901